His Rise to Fame is a 1927 American silent drama film directed by Bernard McEveety and starring George Walsh, Peggy Shaw and Bradley Barker. A drifter meets a dancer in a cabaret and reforms his life, becoming a championship-winning boxer.

Cast
 George Walsh as Jerry Drake 
 Peggy Shaw as Laura White 
 Bradley Barker as Hubert Strief 
 Mildred Reardon as Helen Lee 
 Martha Petelle as 'Ma' Drake 
 William Nally as Montana Mack 
 Ivan Linow as Bull Vickers

References

Bibliography
 Munden, Kenneth White. The American Film Institute Catalog of Motion Pictures Produced in the United States, Part 1. University of California Press, 1997.

External links

1927 films
1920s sports drama films
American boxing films
American sports drama films
Films directed by Bernard McEveety
American silent feature films
American black-and-white films
1927 drama films
1920s English-language films
1920s American films
Silent American drama films
Silent sports drama films